is a Japanese tokusatsu series that aired from July 4, 1973, to March 27, 1974. It was produced by Nippon Gendai Kikaku and Senkosha Productions (Senko Planning). Its story was later retold in the anime Red Baron and it had a sequel titled Super Robot Mach Baron.

Plot
The show is set in the early 21st century where the Iron Masked Party, led by Dr. Devilar, steals giant robots built all over the world from an exhibition and kidnap their creators to form a "Robot Empire". Scientist Kenichiro  Kurenai, foreseeing his capture, turns over his own super robot, Red Baron, to his younger brother Ken Kureinai. Ken is a member of SSI (Secret Science Investigation), a highly skilled team of scientists that practice ninjitsu, and uses Red Baron to aid the team in their efforts to stop the Iron Masked Party from taking over the world. Later in the series, the Iron Masked Party is revealed to be an organization from Mars and led by the renegade super computer Garis Q and intends to destroy the world as practice before taking over the universe.

Episode list

Cast
Ken Kenichiro: Yosuke Okada
Mari Matsubara: Rei Maki
Daisaku Hori: Pepe Hozumi
Tetsuya Sakai: Hisashi Kato
Jitsu Osato: Tetsuya Oshita
Shiro Makami: Tetsuya Ushio
Ippei Kumano: Isao Tamagawa
Kenichiro Kurenai/Android X: Nobuyuki Ishida
Dr. Deviler: Hiroshi Ikaida

Enemy Robots

Stolen National Robots
Big Bison (America)
Black Masai (Kenya)
Agun-Garuda (Indonesia) 
Hiryu (Japan)
Viking III (Norway)
Blizzard 7 (Iceland)
Bedouin G (Arabia)
Vesuvius Y (Italy)
Mau Mau (Union of South Africa)
Garnison Ace (Canada)
Eleci Amazon (Brazil)
McKinley V6 (America (Alaska))
King John Bull (England)
Proto-Andes (Peru)
Iron Cross G (West Germany)
Gran Matador (Spain)
Rajasthan (India)
Magma Wolf (Japan)
Sphinxer (Egypt)
Escargos (France)
Mongol Star (Mongolia)

Iron Masked Party Originals
Troy Horse
Goryu
Schekler Robot
Sky Shark
King Devilar
Martian Saturn
Gold Finger
Bem Panthers 01, 02, and 03
Devil Ghoster
Mars Bird
Spider Robot
Donkey One
Dracubat
Deimos Z

Notes

References
Super Robot Red Baron at Japan Hero
 
Sûpâ Robotto Reddo Baron on Japanese Wikipedia for kanji title comparison

External links 
 

1973 Japanese television series debuts
1974 Japanese television series endings
Tokusatsu television series
Nippon TV original programming